Brighton Festival is a large, annual, curated multi-arts festival in England. It includes music, theatre, dance, circus, art, film, literature, debate, outdoor and family events, and takes place in venues in the city of Brighton and Hove in England each May.

History 

In 1964 the first moves were made to hold a Festival in Brighton, and Ian Hunter, the eventual artistic director of the festival, submitted a programme of ideas. This was followed by a weekend conference in 1965, and the Board of the Brighton Festival Society was born. The first festival was held in 1967, and included the first ever exhibition of Concrete poetry in the UK, alongside performances by Laurence Olivier and Yehudi Menuhin.

In the introduction to the 1968 Festival programme, Ian Hunter explained the original intentions of the festival: “The aim of the Brighton Festival is to stimulate townsfolk and visitors into taking a new look at the arts and to give them the opportunity to assess developments in the field of culture where the serious and the apparently flippant ride side by side.”

In 2016 Brighton Festival celebrated its 50th year. The festival's biggest talking point was Nutkhut's Dr Blighty, an ambitious, large-scale, free immersive, outdoor experience co-commissioned in partnership with Royal Pavilion & Museums and 14-18 NOW, which highlighted the story of wounded Indian soldiers hospitalised in Brighton during WW1. Ending each night with a spectacular light display using projection-mapping, Dr Blighty set the city and social media abuzz and drew audiences of almost 65,000 over its five-day run.

The festival regularly commissions new work from some artists and companies. The 2016 Brighton Festival featured 54 commissions, co-commissions, exclusives and premieres including the UK premiere of Laurie Anderson's unique Music for Dogs, a concert specially designed for the canine ear; the UK premiere of Lou Reed Drones, an installation of Anderson's late husband's guitars and amps in feedback mode which she describes as "kind of as close to Lou's music as we can get these days", a re-enactment of every onstage death from the plays of Shakespeare from Brighton-based Spymonkey and Tim Crouch; and Blast Theory & Hydrocracker's immersive undercover police drama Operation Black Antler.

In 2020, the festival was cancelled for the first time in its history as a result of the coronavirus pandemic.

Guest directors
Each year since 2009 the festival has appointed a guest artistic director. 
2009: Anish Kapoor 
2010: Brian Eno 
2011: Aung San Suu Kyi
2012: Vanessa Redgrave
2013: Michael Rosen
2014: Hofesh Shechter
2015: Ali Smith
2016: Laurie Anderson
2017: Kae Tempest
2018: David Shrigley
2019: Rokia Traoré
2020: Cancelled due to the COVID-19 pandemic; Lemn Sissay was to direct
2021: Lemn Sissay

See also 
 Brighton Fringe (England's largest arts festival)
 Edinburgh Fringe (the UK's largest arts festival)
 Norfolk and Norwich Festival (The UK's oldest arts festival)

References

External links 
 Brighton Festival – Brighton Festival official website
 Brighton Festival Chorus – website for separate element of the Brighton Festival

Arts festivals in England
Festivals in Brighton and Hove
Festivals established in 1966
1966 establishments in England
Music in Brighton and Hove